WWTP (89.5 FM) is a Catholic talk radio station licensed to serve Augusta, Maine, United States. The station is an affiliate of Relevant Radio and is owned by Relevant Radio, Inc. The station signed on in April 2012 as a simulcast of WXTP in Portland. The station is also heard in the Bangor area on WXBP.

References

External links
 

Catholic radio stations
Companies based in Augusta, Maine
Radio stations established in 2012
2012 establishments in Maine
Relevant Radio stations
WTP